Ute Berg (born 24 July 1953 in Essen) is a German politician and member of the SPD. She graduated from the University of Göttingen in 1974 in Political Science.

Since 2011 Berg has been the head of the economic analysis department for the city of Cologne.

Notes and references

1953 births
Living people
Female members of the Bundestag
Members of the Bundestag for North Rhine-Westphalia
University of Göttingen alumni
Politicians from Essen
21st-century German women politicians
Members of the Bundestag 2005–2009
Members of the Bundestag 2002–2005
Members of the Bundestag for the Social Democratic Party of Germany